Oscar Polk (December 25, 1899 – January 4, 1949) was an American actor. He  portrayed the servant Pork in the film Gone with the Wind (1939).

Career 
His most memorable scene in that film comes when Pork discloses to Scarlett O'Hara, portrayed by Vivien Leigh, that the back property taxes on Tara are $300. He was married to Ivy V. Polk (née Ivy Parsons), who also had an uncredited role in Gone with the Wind. Together they had a son, Oscar Polk Jr.

On January 4, 1949, Oscar Polk was fatally struck by a taxi cab as he stepped off a curb in Times Square in New York City ten days after his 49th birthday. At the time of his death, he was scheduled to have a major role in the play Leading Lady, and he was replaced by Ossie Davis. He is buried at Mount Olivet Cemetery, Maspeth, Long Island, New York.

Theatre credits

Broadway
The Trial of Mary Dugan (1927)
Once in a Lifetime (1930)
Both Your Houses (1933)
The Green Pastures (1935)
You Can't Take It with You (1936)
Swingin' The Dream (1939), a swing music adaptation of A Midsummer Night's Dream.
Sunny River (1942)
The Walking Gentleman (1942)
Dark Eyes (1943)

Other stage credits
 Horses Are Like That (1943)
 Bigger Than Barnum (1946)
 The Magnificent Heel (1946)

Filmography

References

External links

 
 
 

1899 births
1949 deaths
American male film actors
People from Marianna, Arkansas
Male actors from Arkansas
Road incident deaths in New York City
Pedestrian road incident deaths
African-American male actors
20th-century American male actors
American male stage actors
20th-century African-American people